Diviseema is a small and deltaic island in Krishna District of the Indian state of Andhra Pradesh. It comprises three Mandals - Ghantasala, Avanigadda, Koduru and Nagayalanka.

Etymology 
The word Diviseema translates as the abode of the divine.

Diviseema is obtained from the two words Deevi meaning 'island' and seema meaning 'country' or 'region' in telugu... Diviseema (pronounced as Deeviseema) means 'Region of the Island'...

Geography 
Diviseema is located in the delta area formed at Puligadda (Avanigadda), where the Krishna River is divided into two before merging into the Bay of Bengal. One merges in Bay of Bengal at Hamsaladeevi (Koduru mandal) and the other near to Gullalamoda (Nagayalanka mandal).

It is a fertile low lying plain interspersed with Krishna river and its distributaries. It is irrigated by canal irrigation drawn from Prakasam Barrage at Vijayawada. The confluence of Krishna River and Bay of Bengal at Palakayatippa is a weekend getaway and also a pilgrimage center. Towards the sea, Diviseema has rich mangroves and is notified as Krishna Wildlife Sanctuary.

Cyclone 
The unprecedented loss of human life suffered during the 1977 Andhra Pradesh cyclone across this region on 19 November 1977. It is estimated that 10,000 people and 10,00,000 animals died as a result of this natural disaster. The survivors have recouped, due largely to voluntary organizations and governmental efforts.

References 

Geography of Krishna district
Islands of Andhra Pradesh
Islands of India
Populated places in India
Islands of the Bay of Bengal